Teatro Tomasino is the official theater guild of the University of Santo Tomas in Manila, Philippines.

History 
The group was formed by 25 students under the supervisions of Professor Myrna Hilario and Professor Piedad Guinto on September 17, 1977.

Formal workshops started on April 2, 1977 under Maryo J. de los Reyes, Soxie Topacio, Jonee Gamboa, Nicanor Agudo, Sonia Roco, Adul de Leon, Sol Oca, Pilar de Gurman, Bernardo Bernardo and Lino Brocka. Subsequently, the first production was held with the performance of Orlando Nadres' Ang Awit na Hindi Matapos-tapos under the direction of Maryo J. de los Reyes.

Most of its productions are held at the Albertus Magnus Auditorium at the University of Santo Tomas.

Select Production

Alumni
 John Lapus
 Piolo Pascual
 Wenn Deramas
Arnold Clavio

Awards and Citations 
 CCP Theater Venue Grantee (1990)
 Most Unique Performance by a Group Delegate - ASEAN Arts Festival in Kuala Lumpur, Malaysia (1994)
 World Youth Day Performance (1995)
 Pope Leo XIII Award (1991–1995)
 Outstanding Service Award (2011 - 2012)

References 

Musical theatre companies
Theatre companies in the Philippines
Organizations established in 1980
Theater companies in Metro Manila
Cultural organizations based in the Philippines
Theatre in the Philippines